Karol Langner (June 28, 1843 in Deutsch Piekar in Oberschlesien (today Piekary Śląskie) – January 1912 in Negaunee, Michigan) was a Polish priest and schoolmate of Jan Pitass. Starting as a priest in Marquette, Michigan in 1869, he was later assigned a pastorate in nearby Escanaba, where he stayed for twelve years and witnessed the growth of a considerable Polish community.

Langner was reassigned in 1885 to a German community near Houghton, Michigan, and in 1899 to St. Paul's Parish in Negaunee, where he remained until his death in 1912. He was distinguished with a domestic prelate by Pope Leo XIII in 1900, the same year he became vicar general in the Marquette Diocese.

1843 births
1912 deaths
People from Piekary Śląskie
Polish Roman Catholic priests
People from the Province of Silesia
German emigrants to the United States